List of hoards may refer to:

 List of hoards in Britain
 List of Bronze Age hoards in Britain
 List of Iron Age hoards in Britain
 List of Roman hoards in Britain
 List of hoards in Ireland
 List of hoards in the Channel Islands
 List of hoards in Romania
 List of hoards in Asia